Bagru is a town and a municipality in Jaipur district (Tehsil Sanganer) in the state of Rajasthan, India. It is located at a distance of 32 km from Jaipur, on Jaipur-Ajmer Road.

Demographics
At the 2011 India census, Bagru had a population of 31,229. Males constituted 52% of the population and females 48%.  

Bagru had an average literacy rate of 71.43%, lower than the national average of 74.04%, but higher than the state average of 66.11%; with 66% of the males and 34% of females literate.  

18% of the population were under 8 years of age.

Economy 

Bagru is known for natural dyes and hand block printing. Bagru is the home of both the Raiger and the Chhipa community. Chhipas have been involved in fabric printing tradition for over 100 years.

The Raigers are involved in processing and manufacturing of leather and their products (like boots, mochdi, Rajasthani Jutee and other leather goods). The Raigers export raw leather (semi processed) to big leather companies and also sell in local market (Hatwara, Jaipur). 

Bagru is also known for natural dyeing, indigo dyeing and wooden hand block printing over textile articles.

The famous Jugal Darbar temple is located in Bagru. Here, an annual "Mela" (fair) is organized by the Bagda community which is attended by hundreds of people from neighbouring villages. This is place of peace and unites all communities.

Bagru also has a fort (private property) in heart of town which is normally open to the public on the occasion of the Gangaur Festival.

Textile prints 
Bagru is most famous for its typical wooden hand block prints. These prints of Bagru are widely acclaimed, and known as "Bagru prints". The unique method for printing employs wooden block in it. In the process, the desired design is engraved on the wooden block first and then the carved block is used for replicating the design in the preferred color on the fabric.

In Chippa Mohalla (Printer's quarter) one can walk into the quarter, where people are always engrossed with dyes and blocks. The three-centuries-old tradition of block printing is kept alive with the efforts of Bagru artisans. Keeping the convention, these artisans smear the cloth with Fuller's earth from the riverside and then dip it in turmeric water to get the habitual cream color background. After that, they stamp the cloth with designs using natural dyes of earthly shades.

Even today, artisans use traditional vegetable dyes for printing the cloth. Like, the color blue is made from indigo, greens out of indigo mixed with pomegranate, red from madder root and yellow from turmeric. Usually Bagru prints have ethnic floral patterns in natural colors. Bagru prints form the essential part of the block printing industry of Rajasthan. The village fabricates some of the bed covers and other materials.

Education 
There are many educational institutes, including the Government High Secondary School, Mahila Mahavidyalay (girls only), Chaudhary Public School, Waris international School (since 2002), MG English International School Bagru (founded by Manish Gupta). 

In 2015 there were approximately 10 private schools are running in Bagru.

References

Cities and towns in Jaipur district